The 2018 UCI Africa Tour was the 14th season of the UCI Africa Tour. The season began on 27 October 2017 with the Tour du Faso and ended on 30 September 2018.

The points leader, based on the cumulative results of previous races, wears the UCI Africa Tour cycling jersey.

Throughout the season, points are awarded to the top finishers of stages within stage races and the final general classification standings of each of the stages races and one-day events. The quality and complexity of a race also determines how many points are awarded to the top finishers: the higher the UCI rating of a race, the more points are awarded.
The UCI ratings from highest to lowest are as follows:
 Multi-day events: 2.HC, 2.1 and 2.2
 One-day events: 1.HC, 1.1 and 1.2

Events

2017

2018

References

 
UCI Africa Tour
UCI Africa Tour
UCI Africa Tour